Tcholmanvissiidae is an extinct family of Orthoptera. There are at least two genera and about eight described species in Tcholmanvissiidae.

Genera
These two genera belong to the family Tcholmanvissiidae:
 † Pinegia Martynov, 1928
 † Tcholmanvissia Zalessky, 1929

References

Orthoptera